William FitzMaurice, 20th Baron Kerry (1633–1696/97) was an Irish nobleman, politician, and peer.  He was the son of Patrick Fitzmaurice, 19th Baron Kerry and Honore Fitzgerald, daughter of Sir Edmund Fitzgerald, Knight of Cloyne.

He married Constance Long (died 12 October 1685), daughter of William Long, and was the father of Thomas Fitzmaurice, 21st Baron and 1st Earl of Kerry.

1633 births
Year of death uncertain
Barons in the Peerage of Ireland
William